Lists of ambassadors of France may refer to:

List of ambassadors of France to Algeria
List of ambassadors of France to Australia
List of ambassadors of France to Austria
List of ambassadors of France to Belgium
List of French ambassadors to Canada
List of ambassadors of France to England
List of ambassadors of France to Germany
List of ambassadors of France to Greece
List of ambassadors of France to Guatemala

List of ambassadors of France to Italy
List of French ambassadors to Israel
List of ambassadors of France to Japan
List of ambassadors of France to Lebanon
List of ambassadors of France to Poland
List of ambassadors of France to Russia
List of ambassadors of France to South Korea
List of ambassadors of France to the Kingdom of Great Britain
List of ambassadors of France to the United Kingdom
List of French ambassadors to the United States

Lists of ambassadors by country of origin